Forward Communist Party (Anandi Mukherji) was a political party in India. FCP(AM) was formed in 1952 following a split in the Forward Communist Party. The group was led by Anandi Mukherji. In the same year as that split, FCP(AM) merged with the Bolshevik Party of India.

Sources
Bose, K., Forward Bloc, Madras: Tamil Nadu Academy of Political Science, 1988.

Defunct communist parties in India
Political parties established in 1952
1952 establishments in India
Political parties disestablished in 1952